Wilson "Wunan" Tortosa is a Filipino comic book artist best known for his works on Tomb Raider and the American re-launch of Battle of The Planets for Top Cow Productions. 
Wilson studied in the Philippine Cultural High School and graduated in the University of Santo Tomas in 2000 with a bachelor's degree in Fine Arts, majoring in advertising.

Bibliography
Exposure: Second Coming, a 13-page backup story (Avatar Press)
Jade #2-4, four issue miniseries (Chaos! Comics)
Jade: Redemption #1-4, four issue miniseries (Chaos! Comics)
Co-artist for Banzai Girl #1-4 (Sirius Entertainment)
Battle of the Planets #1-12 maxiseries (Top Cow Productions)
Tomb Raider #38-39, #41-44 (Top Cow Productions)
Battle of the Planets: Princess #1-6 (Top Cow Productions)
City of Heroes #4-6 (Top Cow Productions)
Shadowcast #1-5 (Harcourt Achieve)
LEGO Exo-Force webcomic
Echobase (Jan Kjaer, Glydendal)
Wolverine: Prodigal Son Vol. 1 (Del Rey)
Bring The Thunder #1-4 (Dynamite Publishing)

External links
Glasshouse Graphics artist page
batangbatugan - deviantART account
Jazma Online interview
thestar.com Wolverine interview
Newsara.com: Alex Ross BRINGs THE THUNDER In New Series
Philippine Comics dot Net - The most comprehensive library of Filipino comics on the internet

Filipino comics artists
1978 births
Living people
University of Santo Tomas alumni